Pishkuh-e Zalaqi Rural District is a rural district (dehestan) in Besharat District, Aligudarz County, Lorestan Province, Iran. At the 2006 census, its population was 3,388, in 597 families.  The rural district has 37 villages. The most populous village is Khak Beh Tiyeh with 512 people at the 2006 census.

References 

Rural Districts of Lorestan Province
Aligudarz County